Africallagma fractum, the slender bluet, is a species of damselfly in the family Coenagrionidae. It has been found in Angola, southern Democratic Republic of the Congo, Zambia, Malawi, Mozambique, Zimbabwe, and eastern South Africa.

Taxonomy
This taxon has been lumped with Africallagma elongatum in the past, but is now recognized as a separate species by most authorities.

References

External links
 
 Africallagma fractum on African Dragonflies and Damselflies Online

Coenagrionidae
Odonata of Africa
Insects described in 1921